The Byelorussian Soviet Socialist Republic League was an ice hockey league contested in the Byelorussian SSR. The league usually consisted of two groups.

Champions
1965: Vympel Minsk
1966: HC Dinamo Minsk (Group A), Vympel Minsk (Group B)
1967: SKA Minsk (Group I), Lokomotiv Gomel (Group II)
1968: HC Dinamo Minsk (Group I), Neftyanik Novopolotsk (Group II)
1969: Vympel Minsk (Group I), Neftyanik Novopolotsk (Group II)
1970: HC Dinamo Minsk (Group I), Gomel GSU (Group IIA), Puffin Minsk (Group IIB)
1971: Spartak Vitebsk (Group I), Neftyanik Novopolotsk (Group II)
1972: Vympel Minsk (Group I), ETZ Gomel (Group II)
1973: Vympel Minsk (Group I), Fiberlgass Polotsk (Group II)
1974: Vympel Minsk (Group I), Satellite Minsk (Group II)
1975: Builder Bobruisk (Group I), Dvina Novopolotsk (Group II)
1976: ETZ Gomel (Group I), Harvest Vitebsk (Group II)
1977: Shinnik Bobruisk (Group I), Satellite Minsk (Group II)
1978: Shinnik Bobruisk (Group I), Berezina Borisov (Group II)
1979: Vympel Minsk (Group I)
1980: Yunost Minsk (Group I), Metallurg Mogilev (Group II)
1981: Shinnik Bobruisk (Group I), BPL Minsk (Group II)
1982: Shinnik Bobruisk (Group I), Motorist Minsk (Group II)
1983: Shinnik Bobruisk (Group I), KSM Grodno (Group II)
1984: unknown
1985: Shinnik Bobruisk (Group I), Instrument Vitebsk (Group II)
1986: Shinnik Bobruisk (Group I), Traktor Minsk (Group II)
1987: SHVSM Grodno (Group I), Instrument Vitebsk (Group II)
1988: SHVSM Grodno (Group I), Khimik Novopolotsk (Group II)
1989: Shinnik Bobruisk (Group I), BPL Minsk (Group II)
1990: Khimik Novopolotsk (Group I), Polesie Gomel (Group II)
1991: Belstal Zhlobin (Group I), Traktor Minsk (Group II)

References

Defunct ice hockey leagues in Europe
Ice hockey leagues in Belarus
Ice hockey leagues in the Soviet Union
Sport in the Byelorussian Soviet Socialist Republic